

A
 Ashishma Nakarmi
 Aashirman DS Joshi
 Anupama Aura Gurung
 Aastha Pokharel
 Ayushman Joshi

B
 Bipana Thapa

C

D

E

F

G

H

I

J
 Jai Bhandari
 Jal Shah
 Jharana Bajracharya 
 Jharna Thapa

K
 Karishma Manandhar
 Keki Adhikari
 Malina Joshi
 Malvika Subba
 Manisha Koirala

L

M

N
 Nagma Shrestha
 Nikita Chandak
 Namrata Shrestha
 Niruta Singh
 Nischal Basnet
 Nisha Adhikari
 Niti Shah

O

P
 Payal Shakya
 Paul Shah
 Priyanka Karki
 Prakriti Shrestha

Q

R
 Raj Ballav Koirala
 Rajesh Hamal
 Reecha Sharma
 Rima Bishwokarma
 Ruby Rana

S
 Sadichha Shrestha
 Sahana Bajracharya
 Samragyee RL Shah
 Sarina Maskey
 Shristi Shrestha
 Swastima Khadka

T
 Tripti Nadakar

U
 Usha Rajak

V

W

X

Y

Z

Models
Lists of models